Cache Col Glacier is in North Cascades National Park in the U.S. state of Washington, on the east slope of Mix-up Peak.

See also
List of glaciers in the United States

References

Glaciers of the North Cascades
Glaciers of Chelan County, Washington
Glaciers of Washington (state)